= Wish for Wings =

Australian metalcore band

- Origin: Brisbane, Queensland, Australia
- Genres: Hardcore punk, metalcore
- Years active: 2002–present
- Labels: Washed Up Records, Skull And Bones Records
- Members: Rhys Watts; Todd Hansenn; Oliver Bones
- Website: http://www.myspace.com/wishforwingsxxx/

Wish for Wings is an Australian metalcore band formed in Brisbane, Queensland in 2002.

In 2003, they released a four-track demo titled xDEMOx, recorded with Adam Merker at Studio Andeers Deebers and distributed through local record shops. However, word quickly spread about the band's energetic live shows and stage presence and ticket sales soon eclipsed those of the demo.

In 2005, the band recorded and released their debut EP, From the Past to the Grave through Washed Up Records which reached No. 10 on the AIR Independent singles chart. The band then toured Australia, New Zealand and Canada in support of the release.

Wish for Wings released their debut album, Afterlife in November 2008.

== Members ==
- Rhys Watts - Vocals
- Aido Spinks - Bass
- Aaron Spinks - Guitar
- Steve Kellner- Drums
- Andy Barber - Guitar

=== Former members ===
- Locky Paul - Vocals
- Oliver Bones - Guitar
- Andy Barber - Guitar
- Tynan Skinner - Drums
- Todd Hansen - Drums
- Shannan Waters - Drums
- Tim Wedel - Drums
- Jake Beazley - Drums

== Discography ==
Date of release	Title	Label
2003	xDEMOx	
2006	From the Past to the Grave	Washed Up Records
2007	As Darkness Falls Tour EP	
2008	Afterlife	Skull And Bones Records
2010	Echoes	Skull And Bones Records
